Võivaku is a village in Põhja-Sakala Parish, Viljandi County, located  north of the town of Viljandi,  north of the small borough of Olustvere and  southwest of the town of Suure-Jaani. The population of Võivaku as of 2015 was 101, a decrease from 106 in the 2000 census.

References

Villages in Viljandi County